North Iowa Community School District is a rural public school district headquartered in Buffalo Center, Iowa.

The district includes sections of Kossuth and Winnebago counties. It serves Buffalo Center, Lakota, Rake, and Thompson.

It was established on July 1, 1996, by the merger of the Buffalo Center–Rake–Lakota Community School District and the Thompson Community School District.

Schools
The district operates three schools, all in Buffalo Center:
 North Iowa Elementary Buffalo Center
 North Iowa Middle School
 North Iowa High School

North Iowa High School

Athletics
The Bison participate in the Top of Iowa Conference in the following sports:
Football
Cross Country
Volleyball
Basketball
Bowling
Wrestling
Golf
Track and Field
Baseball
Softball

See also
List of school districts in Iowa
List of high schools in Iowa

References

External links
 North Iowa Community School District
 School map
 Article index from KLSS (My Star 106)

School districts in Iowa
Education in Kossuth County, Iowa
Education in Winnebago County, Iowa
1996 establishments in Iowa
School districts established in 1996